Donald Cogley Bruce (April 27, 1921 – August 31, 1969) was a U.S. Representative from Indiana and a founder of the American Conservative Union.

Born in Troutville, Pennsylvania, Bruce graduated from high school in Allentown, Pennsylvania, and attended Muskingum College in New Concord, Ohio. He was employed in the radio broadcasting industry for twenty years, serving as program director, business manager, and general manager. In 1960 he was elected to the United States House of Representatives as a Republican from Indiana, serving two terms before being defeated in the 1964 senatorial primary.

Following the landslide defeat of U.S. Senator Barry Goldwater in the November presidential election, Bruce joined with other conservatives to discuss responses to the seeming liberal triumph represented by Lyndon Johnson's reelection. This led to a subsequent meeting in December at which the nascent organization was named the American Conservative Union. Bruce was elected as the ACU's first chairman, a position he held until October of the following year. He also established Bruce Enterprises, a management and political consulting firm.

Bruce died of a heart attack on August 31, 1969 in Round Hill, Virginia and is buried nearby.

See also
 List of members of the House Un-American Activities Committee

References

Donald C. Bruce Finding Aid. Indiana State Library, Rare Books and Manuscripts Division. 2015-07-31. Retrieved 2015-09-11.

1921 births
1969 deaths
Muskingum University alumni
American Lutherans
20th-century American politicians
People from Clearfield County, Pennsylvania
People from Loudoun County, Virginia
20th-century Lutherans
New Right (United States)
Republican Party members of the United States House of Representatives from Indiana